Argyrotaenia graceana is a species of moth of the family Tortricidae. It is found in the United States, where it has been recorded from California, Arizona and New Mexico.

The wingspan is about 20–21 mm. Adults have been recorded on wing from July to August.

References

Moths described in 1960
graceana
Moths of North America